Doris Gertrude Sheppard (1902–1982) was a New Zealand pianist, singer, composer and teacher. She was born in Bromley, Kent, England in 1902.

References

1902 births
1982 deaths
New Zealand women pianists
New Zealand composers
New Zealand music teachers
People from Bromley
English emigrants to New Zealand
20th-century New Zealand women singers
20th-century pianists
20th-century composers
Women music educators
Women classical pianists
20th-century women composers
20th-century women pianists